The 1963 Dartmouth Indians football team was an American football team that represented Dartmouth College during the 1963 NCAA University Division football season. Following its undefeated Ivy League championship season, Dartmouth was league co-champion in 1963.

In their ninth season under head coach Bob Blackman, the Indians compiled a 7–2 record and outscored opponents 175 to 94. Scott Creelman was the team captain.

The Indians' 5–2 conference record tied for best in the Ivy League. Dartmouth was named co-champion despite defeating the other co-champion, Princeton, in the last week of the season. The Indians outscored Ivy opponents 142 to 68. 

Dartmouth played its home games at Memorial Field on the college campus in Hanover, New Hampshire.

Schedule

References

Dartmouth
Dartmouth Big Green football seasons
Ivy League football champion seasons
Dartmouth Indians football